Amblyseius corderoi is a species of mite in the family Phytoseiidae.

References

corderoi
Articles created by Qbugbot
Animals described in 1965